Following is a list of senators of Pas-de-Calais, people who have represented the department of Pas-de-Calais in the Senate of France.

Third Republic

Senators for Pas-de-Calais under the French Third Republic were:

 Louis Dubrulle (1876–1882)
 Charles du Campe de Rosamel (1876–1882)
 Auguste Paris (1876–1891)
 Auguste Huguet (1876–1919)
 Alfred Boucher-Cadart (1882–1884)
 Louis Devaux (1882–1884)
 François Hamille (1885)
 Louis Demiautte (1882–1891)
 Alphonse de Cardevac d'Havrincourt (1886–1891)
 Ernest Camescasse (1891–1897)
 André-Louis Deprez (1891–1900)
 Ferdinand Bouilliez (1891–1908)
 François Ringot (1892–1914)
 Jules Viseur (1897–1920)
 Alfred Leroy (1900–1901)
 Louis Boudenoot (1901–1922)
 Alexandre Ribot (1909–1923)
 Charles Jonnart (1914–1927)
 Henri Bachelet (1920–1930)
 Roger Farjon (1920–1940)
 Amédée Petit (1923)
 Jules Elby (1923–1933)
 Edmond Théret (1924–1934)
 Edmond Lefebvre du Prey (1927–1940)
 Henri Cadot (1930–1936)
 Alfred Salmon (1933–1936)
 Charles Delesalle (1934–1940)
 Paul Bachelet (1936–1940)
 Henri Elby (1936–1940)

Fourth Republic

Senators for Pas-de-Calais under the French Fourth Republic were:

 Auguste Defrance (1946–1948)
 Philippe Gerber (1946–1948)
 Nestor Calonne (1946–1958)
 Bernard Chochoy (1946–1959)
 Émile Vanrullen (1946–1959)
 Jules Pouget (1948–1952)
 Émile Durieux (1948–1959)
 Gabriel Tellier (1948–1959)
 Georges Boulanger (1952–1959)
 Jean Bardol (1958–1959)

Fifth Republic 
Senators for Pas-de-Calais under the French Fifth Republic were:

References

Sources

 
Lists of members of the Senate (France) by department